It Was Raining That Night is an English-Bengali bilingual film. Written and directed by Indian actor-director Mahesh Manjrekar, it is a relationship drama. The film was notable for being a joint production of India, United States and Bangladesh and stars Riaz, Riya Sen, Sushmita Sen, Victor Banerjee, Mahesh Manjrekar, Moon Moon Sen, Atit Shah, Dawn Moeller and Stefanie Siegel.

Cast
 Riaz as Vijay Kumar Dixit / Zaffar Khan
 Sushmita Sen as Ayesha Rao
 Riya Sen as savitri Rao
 Victor Banerjee as Jai Banerjee
 Mahesh Manjrekar as Brij Bhushan
 Moon Moon Sen as Jaya Dixit
 Atit Shah as Virat Dixit
 Dawn Moeller as Johnson
 Stefanie Siegel as Shyna

Box office
It Was Raining That Night film budget was as $950,0000(estimated).

Reception
The filming of It Was Raining That Night started in 2005 in locations such as India and USA. It is also the first time that Bangladeshi actor Riyaz Ahmed has acted with Bollywood actress Sushmita Sen.

See also
 It Was Raining That Night on Yahoo! Movies

References

External links
 
 

2005 films
2000s Bengali-language films
Films directed by Mahesh Manjrekar
2005 multilingual films
Indian multilingual films
Bangladeshi multilingual films
2000s English-language films
American multilingual films
American drama films
Indian drama films
2000s American films